The 2010 Challenger Banque Nationale de Rimouski was a professional tennis tournament played on indoor hard courts. It was the 4th edition of the tournament and part of the 2010 ATP Challenger Tour, offering a total of $35,000 in prize money. It took place in Rimouski, Canada between March 22 and March 28, 2010.

Singles main-draw entrants

Seeds

1 Rankings are as of March 15, 2010

Other entrants
The following players received wildcards into the singles main draw:
 Philip Bester
 Érik Chvojka
 Milos Raonic
 Zachary White

The following players received entry from the qualifying draw:
 Kaden Hensel
 Brydan Klein
 Juho Paukku
 Amir Weintraub

Champions

Singles

 Rik de Voest def.  Tim Smyczek, 6–0, 7–5

Doubles

 Kaden Hensel /  Adam Hubble def.  Scott Lipsky /  David Martin, 7–6(7–5), 3–6, [11–9]

External links
Official website

Challenger Banque Nationale de Rimouski
Challenger de Drummondville
Challenger Banque Nationale de Rimouski
Challenger Banque Nationale de Rimouski
Challenger Banque Nationale de Rimouski